is a Japanese football player. He plays for J2 League club Mito HollyHock. He holds the ongoing record for playing in the most games in J2.

Playing career
Honma was born in Hitachi on April 27, 1977. After graduating from high school, he joined the J1 League club Urawa Reds in 1996. However he played less often than Yuki Takita and Hisashi Tsuchida. In the middle of 1999, Homma moved to the Japan Football League club Mito HollyHock based in his local Ibaraki Prefecture. He became a regular goalkeeper soon afterward. HollyHock won third place in the 1999 season and was promoted to the J2 League in 2000. Although the club results were sluggish in J2, he played as a regular goalkeeper for a long time. On August 14, 2014, he became the first player to have participated in 500 matches in the J2 League. However his opportunity to play decreased behind Takashi Kasahara in the summer of 2016.

Club statistics
.

References

External links

Profile at Mito HollyHock

1977 births
Living people
Association football people from Ibaraki Prefecture
Japanese footballers
J1 League players
J2 League players
Japan Football League players
Urawa Red Diamonds players
Mito HollyHock players
Association football goalkeepers